The Kinmen Folk Culture Village is a cultural center in Jinsha Township, Kinmen County, Taiwan.

History
The culture village was designed by an architect from Jiangxi and built by Wang Kuo-chen, a successful businessman who created his wealth while he was in Japan. The construction started in 1876 and it took 25 years to complete all buildings in this area in the year 1900. During the martial law period, the village was renovated to become a folk culture village and later in 1995 was included into the Kinmen National Park. It was the first village in Kinmen which was turned into a tourist destination.

Architecture
The culture village has the most complete range of types of Fujian buildings and consists of 18 house buildings, which are 16 symmetrical two-courtyard historic houses, an ancestral shrine and a school academy named Hai Jhu Tang. All of the buildings were built on the hillside of Mount Wuhu facing the sea in three orderly rows on a solid granite rock bed. It consists of three settlements, which are Shangbao, Zhongbao and Xiabao. Shanghao and Zhongbao settlements belong to the Wang clan while the Xiaobao settlement belongs to the Liang clan.

See also
 Kinmen

References

1900 establishments in China
Buildings and structures in Kinmen County
Cultural centers in Taiwan
Jinsha Township
Taiwanese folk culture
Tourist attractions in Kinmen County